The 1965–66 Știința Craiova season is the 18th season in the club's history, and the 2nd consecutive in Divizia A, the top league of Romanian football.

Competitions

Overview

Divizia A

League table

Results summary

Positions by round

Matches

Cupa României

AS Aiud (Div. C)	3–1	(Div. A) Știința Craiova

See also

 1965–66 Divizia A
 1965–66 Cupa României

CS Universitatea Craiova seasons
Știința, Craiova
1965–66 in Romanian football